Andy Gibson (born September 15, 1981) is an American country music singer.  He co-wrote "Don't You Wanna Stay", a duet between Jason Aldean and Kelly Clarkson which reached No. 1 on the country music charts in 2011. Later in the year, he signed to R&J Records and released his debut single, "Wanna Make You Love Me". Billy Dukes of Taste of Country gave the song four stars out of five, saying that it "begin[s] gathering attention after frequent listens." The song has been made into a music video directed by David McClister, which has aired on CMT. Gibson moved to Curb Records in April 2012 following the closure of R&J, although some R&J staff continued promotion of "Wanna Make You Love Me". Gibson's first Curb single, "Summer Back", entered the charts in late 2012.

Discography

Compilation albums

Singles

Music videos

References

1981 births
American country singer-songwriters
American male singer-songwriters
Curb Records artists
Living people
Country musicians from Washington (state)
Musicians from Spokane, Washington
R&J Records artists
Singer-songwriters from Washington (state)
21st-century American singers
21st-century American male singers